Charles Cathmer Ross (June 14, 1884 – September 12, 1938) was a provincial politician from Alberta, Canada. He served as a member of the Legislative Assembly of Alberta from 1935 to his death in 1938, sitting with the Social Credit caucus in government. He was Minister of Lands and Mines in the government from September 3, 1935 to January 5, 1937. Appointed to cabinet without a seat in the legislature, he ran in a 1935 by-election, for which Athabasca incumbent Clarence Tade resigned his seat for. Ross died in office of heart disease in 1938.

References

1884 births
1938 deaths
Alberta Social Credit Party MLAs
Members of the Executive Council of Alberta
Politicians from Ottawa
People from Athabasca County